Muskrat Lake (formerly Squaw Lake) is a lake located south of Inlet, New York. Fish species present in the lake are brook trout, white sucker, and black bullhead. Access by carry down on the east shore.

References

Lakes of New York (state)
Lakes of Hamilton County, New York